This list includes companies which produce, distribute or promote pornography.

See also 
 List of film production companies
 List of pornographic film studios
 List of pornographic film directors
 List of pornographic magazines
 MindGeek

References

External links 
 List of distributors on Internet Adult Film Database
 List of studios on Internet Adult Film Database
 List of studios on Adult Film Database

Lists of companies by industry
Companies